Dennis Gilbert may refer to:

Dennis Gilbert (baseball) (born 1947), baseball player, agent, and executive
Dennis Gilbert (sociologist), professor and chair of sociology at Hamilton College in Clinton, New York
Dennis Gilbert (ice hockey) (born 1996), American ice hockey player